Union Township is one of fourteen townships in Phelps County, Nebraska, United States. The population was 523 at the 2000 census. A 2006 estimate placed the township's population at 525.

A portion of the Village of Bertand lies within the Township.

References

External links
City-Data.com

Townships in Phelps County, Nebraska
Townships in Nebraska